Nikolaj og Julie is a 2002 Danish drama television series created by Adam Price and produced by DR1, and starred Peter Mygind and Sofie Gråbøl.

Plot 
Nikolaj and Julie, form a young couple who reunite in Copenhagen, marrying soon after having their first daughter. Everything seems to go well until the pressures of work, the creation of children and friendships make the relationship into crisis.

Cast 
Peter Mygind ... Nikolaj Bergstrøm
Sofie Gråbøl ... Julie Krogh Andersen
Dejan Čukić ... Philip Krøyer
Sofie Stougaard ... Karina Kristensen
Jesper Asholt ... Frank Kristensen
Therese Glahn ... Søs Krogh Andersen
Jonatan Tulested ... Jonatan Kristensen
Mattias Tulested ... Mattias Kristensen
Helle Fagralid ... Iben Vangsø
Samir Di Johansson ...Advokat
Nanna Jønsson-Moll ...Emma Bergstrøm Andersen
Henning Jensen ...Hoffmann
Peter Gantzler ... Lars Eriksen
Lars Mikkelsen ... Per Køller

Awards

References

External links 
 Nikolaj og Julie at Internet Movie Database

Danish drama television series
DR television dramas
2000s Danish television series
2003 Danish television series debuts
2003 Danish television series endings
International Emmy Award for Best Drama Series winners
Danish-language television shows